Recep İvedik 7 is a Turkish comedy film, signed by Cielo Medya, released on Disney+ on December 9, 2022, directed by Togan Gökbakar and co-written with Şahan Gökbakar, starring Şahan Gökbakar, Öznur Serçeler and Nurullah Çelebi. It is the seventh film in the Recep İvedik film series.

Storyline 
Recep and Nurullah decide to go village house, which is inherited from his grandma. Recep finds out the existence of a big project, that will damage the village and the surrounding forests. Villagers will fight against the project with Recep's leadership.

Cast 

 Şahan Gökbakar - Recep İvedik
 Öznur Serçeler -Lawyer Büşra Altın
 Nurullah Çelebi - Nurullah Sağlam
 Eray Türk - Teacher Kemal
 İrfan Kangı - Erdem Çökelek
 Murat Ergür -Headman Asım Civan
 Murat Dalkılıç - himself
 Mehmet İlhami Adsal - Enver Çökelek
 Turgut Çalhan - Salih Brother
 Fatih Batı - Martı Bıyık Fatih
 Barış Ali Çeliker - Bilya Cemal
 Gönen Fatih Yemez - Jan Klod Adnan
 Murat Bölücek - Biberli Hasan
 Şahabettin Karabulut - Zıp Zıp Orhan
 Cennet Uğurlu - Baltalı Sultan

References

External links 
 

2022 comedy films
Films set in Istanbul
Films shot in Istanbul
Films directed by Togan Gökbakar
Turkish sequel films
Turkish comedy films